was a Japanese actor and voice actor from Tokyo.

Filmography

Television animation
1960s
Tetsujin 28-go (1963) – Inspector Bera
Perman (1967) – Mr. Koike
Osomatsu-kun (1967)
Kaibutsu-kun (1968)
Kamui the Ninja (1969) – Miwata
1970s
Ashita no Joe (1970) – Hyoromatsu
Ganba no Bōken (1975) – Tsuburi
Blocker Gundan 4 Machine Blaster (1976) – Professor Mino
Invincible Steel Man Daitarn 3 (1978) – Edwin
Zenderman (1979) – A governor‐general
1980s
Doraemon (1980) – Shizuka's uncle
Rescueman (1980) – Chiba Shusaku Narimasa
Gatchaman Fighter (1980) – Kentarō Washio
Dash Kappei (1981) – Akane's father
Yattodetaman (1981) – Major Horikawa
Six God Combination Godmars (1981) – Kir
Gyakuten! Ippatsuman (1982) – Zeninashi
The Mysterious Cities of Gold (1982) – Andreth
Magical Princess Minky Momo (1982) – Kent
Armored Trooper Votoms (1983) – Shimkas Futtor
Bagi, the Monster of Mighty Nature (1984) – Ryo's father
Metal Armor Dragonar (1987) – Jim Austin
Oishinbo (1988) – Hideo Tanimura
The Three-Eyed One (1989) – Dr. Kenmochi
1990s
Nintama Rantarō (1993) – Shinkuro Hashimoto
Saint Tail (1995) – Asakura
2000s
Argento Soma (2000) – Makarov
Detective Conan (2003) – Nagumo

OVA
Legend of the Galactic Heroes (1989) – Legrange
Genesis Survivor Gaiarth (1992) – Landis
Armitage III (1995) – Dr. Asakura

Theatrical animation
The Mystery of Mamo (1978) – Personnel (Dietman)
Golgo 13: The Professional (1983) - Pago
Mobile Suit Gundam: Char's Counterattack (1988) – Adenauer Paraya

Video games
Mitsumete Knight (1998) – Gustav Benindandy

Dubbing

Live-action
Amadeus – Count Von Strack (Roderick Cook)
A Better Tomorrow II – Lung Sei (Dean Shek)
Blue Steel – Frank Turner (Philip Bosco)
Brainstorm – Hal Abramson (Joe Dorsey)
Captain America – President Tom Kimball (Ronny Cox)
Combat! – Pvt. "Doc" Walton (Conlan Carter)
Die Hard – Dwayne T. Robinson (Paul Gleason)
ER – Mr. Thurnhurst (Franklin Cover)
Fist of Fury – Fan Junxia (Tien Feng)
For Love or Money – Mr. Harry Wegman (Michael Tucker)
Gunfight at the O.K. Corral (1977 NTV edition) – Virgil Earp (John Hudson)
Halloween II (1988 NTV edition) – Graham (Jeffrey Kramer)
The Hitcher (1987 TV Tokyo edition) – Sergeant Starr (John M. Jackson)
I Dream of Jeannie – Captain/Major Roger Healey (Bill Daily) (2nd voice)
Jennifer 8 – Chief Citrine (Kevin Conway)
Joe Kidd (1975 NTV edition) – Mitchell (Gregory Walcott)
Seven Golden Men (1982 TV Tokyo edition) – Bank Manager (José Suárez)
Tower of Death – Lewis (Roy Horan)
Wall Street (1991 Fuji TV edition) – Harold Salt (Saul Rubinek)

Animation
Batman: The Animated Series – Mayor Hamilton Hill
Darkwing Duck — Bushroot

References

External links
Official profile 

1932 births
2003 deaths
Japanese male voice actors
People from Tokyo